Theodor "Theo" Osterkamp (15 April 1892 – 2 January 1975) was a German fighter pilot during World War I and World War II. A flying ace, he achieved 32 victories in World War I. In World War II, he led Jagdgeschwader 51 up to the Battle of Britain and claimed a further five victories during World War II, in the process becoming one of only a few men to score victories and become an ace in both world wars.

Early life and World War I
Osterkamp was born in Rölsdorf near Düren, West Germany, and grew up in Aschersleben, modern day Saxony-Anhalt. He was born in 1892 as the second son of the factory owner Hermann Osterkamp and Anna Wilhelmine née Blank. Osterkamp received his Abitur from the Gymnasium in Dessau. His schoolmates in Dessau included the future pilots Oswald Boelcke and Gotthard Sachsenberg.

When the First World War started he was studying forestry but decided to enlist in the German Army. He was rejected for service due to his "slight build" and he instead enlisted in the Marinefliegerkorps in August 1914. He then flew with the 2. Marine-Fliegerabteilung in Flanders. During 1915–1916, he served as an air observer, and became the first German pilot to fly a land-based aircraft to England on a reconnaissance-mission. Osterkamp claimed his first (but unconfirmed) kill on 6 September 1916 as an observer to pilot Leutnant zur See Wilhelm Mattheus in a LVG C.II two-seater aircraft. In March 1917, he joined the Kampffliegerschule (Combat pilot school) in Putzig and then joined Marine Feld Jagdstaffel 1 on the 14th of April 1917 On 21 March 1917, Leutnant Osterkamp took command of Marine Feld Jagdstaffel 2  He scored a total of 32 victories during the war, and was awarded the Prussian military order Pour le Mérite on 2 September 1918, and was one of the last individuals to receive it.

Interwar years

Osterkamp joined the new Luftwaffe on 1 August 1933 with the rank of Hauptmann. He also participated in the second, third and fourth FAI International Tourist Plane Contest Challenge 1930 (11th place), Challenge 1932 (12th place) and Challenge 1934 (5th place). On 1 April 1935, Osterkamp was appointed Staffelkapitän (squadron leader) of 4. Staffel (4th squadron) of Jagdgeschwader 132 "Richthofen" (JG 132—132nd Fighter Wing), the first commander of this newly created Staffel. On 15 March 1936, Osterkamp transferred command of 4. Staffel to Hauptmann Clemens Graf von Schönborn-Wiesentheid. Osterkamp was then appointed Gruppenkommandeur (group commander) of II. Gruppe of Jagdgeschwader 134 "Horst Wessel" (JG 134—134th Fighter Wing). He held this position until November 1937 when he was transferred to the Jagdfliegerschule Werneuchen, later (JFS 1).

World War II

World War II in Europe began on Friday 1 September 1939 when German forces invaded Poland. On 19 September, Oberst Osterkamp was appointed Geschwaderkommodore of Jagdgeschwader 51 (JG 51—51st Fighter Wing). During the Battle of France, he claimed four victories. During the Kanalkampf period of the Battle of Britain in July 1940, he claimed a further two victories, (a Bristol Blenheim on 1 June and a Spitfire on 13 July 1940) bringing his total to six. He was replaced as commander of JG 51 by Werner Mölders on 23 July with the latter formally taking command on the 27 July. Promoted to Generalmajor, Osterkamp was awarded his Knight's Cross of the Iron Cross on 22 August 1940. Following his replacement in JG 51, Osterkamp was appointed Jagdfliegerführer 2, the commander of fighter aircraft in Luftflotte 2.

On 1 August 1942, he was transferred to Luftgaustab z.b.V. Afrika. On 5 April 1943, he was appointed Jagdfliegerführer Sizilien and served until replaced on 15 June by Adolf Galland. He then served in a number of staff positions until being appointed Inspekteur der Luftwaffen-Bodenorganisation (Inspector of Luftwaffe ground organisation) in 1944. His criticism of the Oberkommando der Luftwaffe (Luftwaffe High Command) led to his dismissal  from service in December 1944.

Post-war career
In 1960, he was appointed honorary chairman of the Gemeinschaft der Jagdflieger, the Association of Fighter Pilots.

Summary of career

Aerial victory claims
Mathews and Foreman, authors of Luftwaffe Aces — Biographies and Victory Claims, researched the German Federal Archives and found records for 31 aerial victory claims, plus six further unconfirmed claims during World War I and three further unconfirmed claims during World War II. This number includes 29 claims during the World War I and two on the Western Front of World War II.

Awards and decorations
 Iron Cross (1914) 2nd Class & 1st Class
 Knight's Cross of the Royal House Order of Hohenzollern with Swords 
 Military Honor Medal (Prussia)
 Baltic Cross 2nd Class
 Pilot’s Badge German Empire (Naval)
 Pour le Mérite (2 September 1918)
Honour Cross of the World War 1914/1918
 Combined Pilots-Observation Badge
 Clasp to the Iron Cross (1939) 2nd Class & 1st Class
 Knight's Cross of the Iron Cross on 22 August 1940 as Generalmajor and Jagdfliegerführer of Luftflotte 2

Publications

Notes

References

Citations

Bibliography

 
 
 
 
 
 
 
 
 
 
 
 

1892 births
1975 deaths
Luftwaffe pilots
Luftwaffe World War II generals
German World War I flying aces
German World War II flying aces
People from the Rhine Province
Recipients of the Knight's Cross of the Iron Cross
Recipients of the Pour le Mérite (military class)
Imperial German Navy personnel of World War I
People from Düren
20th-century Freikorps personnel
Recipients of the clasp to the Iron Cross, 1st class
Lieutenant generals of the Luftwaffe
Military personnel from North Rhine-Westphalia